Nicolas Mahut and Lovro Zovko were the defending champions but decided not to participate.
All semifinal matches had been cancelled by the supervisor, due to heavy rain and flooding. This event was reinstated at players request.
Michael Kohlmann and Alexander Peya won the title, defeating Andre Begemann and Matthew Ebden 6–2, 6–2 in the final.

Seeds

Draw

Draw

References
 Main Draw

Soweto Open - Doubles
2011 Men's Doubles